Krogh may refer to:

Surname
 Anders Krogh, professor in bioinformatics
 August Krogh (1874–1949), Danish professor in zoophysiology
 Egil Krogh (nickname "Bud"; 1939–2020), American lawyer
 Grethe Krogh (1928–2018), Danish organist and professor
 Hanne Krogh (born 1956), popular Norwegian singer
 Jan Krogh Jensen (1958–1996), Danish gangster
 Lars Krogh Jeppesen (born 1979), Danish handball player
 Mogens Krogh (born 1963), Danish footballer
 Søren Krogh (born 1977), Danish footballer
 Sverre Krogh (politician) (1921–2006), Norwegian politician
 Sverre Krogh (editor) (1883–1957), Norwegian editor and later Nazi
 Sverre Krogh Sundbø (born 1981), Norwegian poker player
 Thomas Edvard Krogh (1936–2008), geochronologist
 Gerhard Christoph von Krogh (1785–1860), Danish military officer

Places
United States
 Kroghville, Wisconsin

Other
 Krogh (crater), a small lunar impact crater

See also
 Krog (surname)
 Krohg
 Crough
 Crow (disambiguation)